NPİSTANBUL Brain Hospital (NPİSTANBUL or NPI) is the first Neuropsychiatric Hospital in Turkey. Established on March 20, 2007 with attendance of Parliament Speaker Mr Bulent Arınç. NPİSTANBUL emphasizes cooperation of psychology, neurology and psychiatry, patients are examined by all three branches of science, and the results are evaluated in common case meetings and consultations. NPISTANBUL Neuropsychiatry Hospital proven the quality of service offered on the diagnosis and treatment with international standards in the field of neuropsychiatry by the Joint Commission for the second time.

References

External links
About NPİSTANBUL

Hospital buildings completed in 2007
Academic health science centres
Hospitals established in 2007